Strzepcz is a village in the administrative district of Gmina Linia, within Wejherowo County, Pomeranian Voivodeship in northern Poland. Its population is 766. For the region's history, see History of Pomerania. It is home to Kashubian Secondary School..

Notable residents
 Historian Zygmunt Milczewski was born in Strzepcz.

References

Strzepcz